Curt Lucas (20 January 1888 – 12 September 1960) was a German stage, film and voice actor.

Partial filmography

 Wie das Schicksal spielt (1920) - Dr. Heinrich Jessen - Thoras Verlobter
 A Shot at Dawn (1932) - Holzknecht
 A Door Opens (1933) - Martin Fichtner, sein Kompagnon
 Gold (1934) - (uncredited)
 Herr Kobin geht auf Abenteuer (1934) - Kriminalrat Winkelmann
 Madrigal (1935)
 Augustus the Strong (1936) - Graf Hoym
 Arzt aus Leidenschaft (1936) - Staatsanwalt
 Moral (1936) - Direktor Bollandt
 Truxa (1937) - Jimmy, Garvins Assistenz
 The Glass Ball (1937) - Diener
 Unter Ausschluß der Öffentlichkeit (1937) - Staatsanwalt
 Mit versiegelter Order (1938) - Batscheff
 Ich verweigere die Aussage (1939) - Der Staatsanwalt
 The Fox of Glenarvon (1940) - Bankier Beverly
 Charivan (1941) - Bachmann
 Ich klage an (1941) - Sanitätsrat Klapper
 The Thing About Styx (1942) - Jules Stone
 Das Leben geht weiter (1945)
 Briefträger Müller (1953)
 I Was an Ugly Girl (1955) - Diener Franz
 Ein Mädchen aus Flandern (1956)
 Liane, Jungle Goddess (1956) - Ship's Captain
 Mazurka der Liebe (1957) - Bürgermeister

Bibliography
 Bach, Steven. Marlene Dietrich: Life and Legend. University of Minnesota Press, 2011.
 Fox, Jo. Film propaganda in Britain and Nazi Germany: World War II Cinema. Berg, 2007.

External links

1888 births
1960 deaths
German male film actors
German male stage actors
German male silent film actors
German male voice actors
20th-century German male actors
Actors from Brandenburg
People from Märkisch-Oderland